Žana Minina (born 11 June 1977) is a Lithuanian sprinter. She competed in the women's 400 metres at the 2000 Summer Olympics.

References

1977 births
Living people
Athletes (track and field) at the 2000 Summer Olympics
Lithuanian female sprinters
Olympic athletes of Lithuania
Place of birth missing (living people)
Olympic female sprinters